The  Los Angeles Kiss season was the second season for the arena football franchise in the Arena Football League. The team was coached by Bob McMillen and played their home games at Honda Center. After a disappointing 0-9 start, the Kiss won four out of their last nine games, including a road upset of the Sabercats, who had entered the game 11-0. Despite the strong finish to improve to 4-14, the Kiss failed to make the playoffs.

Standings

Schedule

Regular season
The 2015 regular season schedule was released on December 19, 2014.

Roster

References

Los Angeles Kiss
Los Angeles Kiss seasons
Los Angeles Kiss